Mullivaikkal Remembrance Day (or simply Mullivaikkal Day;  Muḷḷivāykkāl Niṉaivu Nāḷ) is a remembrance day observed by Sri Lankan Tamil people to remember those who died in the final stages of the Sri Lankan Civil War. It is held each year on 18 May, the date on which the civil war ended in 2009, and is named after Mullivaikkal, a village on the north-east coast of Sri Lanka which was the scene of the final battle of the civil war.

Background

Between 1983 and 2009, the Liberation Tigers of Tamil Eelam (LTTE) fought against the Sri Lankan government  to create an independent state in the north and east of Sri Lanka called Tamil Eelam. By 2007 the civil war had cost an estimated 70,000 lives. The final months of the civil war in late 2008/early 2009 witnessed particularly brutal fighting between the Sri Lankan military and the LTTE. Around 300,000 civilians were trapped between the two sides. There were major human rights violations on both sides.  The civil war ended on 18 May 2009 with the killing of Velupillai Prabhakaran, leader of the LTTE. A United Nations report found that as many as 40,000 civilians may have been killed in the final months of the civil war, mostly as a result of indiscriminate shelling by the Sri Lankan military. There are widespread allegations that both sides committed atrocities and human rights violations including war crimes. The Office of the United Nations High Commissioner for Human Rights is currently investigating the alleged war crimes.

Commemoration banned
The Sri Lankan government, which has declared 18 May as Victory Day, celebrates the day with military parades. The day is also a commemoration for dead military personnel who are treated as "war heroes". However, there is no official commemoration for the thousands of Tamil civilians killed in the civil war despite the government's own Lessons Learnt and Reconciliation Commission recommending that all the war's dead be commemorated on National Day (4 February). Instead, the government has virtually banned Tamils from commemorating their war dead. In the run up to 18 May security is tightened in the Tamil dominated Northern and Eastern provinces and schools and universities are closed to prevent any public commemoration.

The government and its security forces regard any commemoration by Tamils to be commemoration of the LTTE, not civilians. The security forces claim that Tamils may commemorate dead LTTE members in private but there have been reports of the military entering homes to prevent commemoration.

Under the Presidency of the Rajapaksa family, 18 May was seen as Victory day, but in 2015 when Maithripala Sirisena  took hold of power it was name to Remembrance day.

Remembrance day
Despite the security restrictions Tamils in Sri Lanka hold small events on 18 May, which they call Mullivaikkal Remembrance Day, to commemorate their dead. However, public commemorations are dealt with harshly by the Sri Lankan security forces. Tamil politicians have been arrested for commemorating Mullivaikkal Remembrance Day.

In the Indian state of Tamil Nadu, a number of political parties, youth organizations, social movement groups etc. organize a number of remembrance events across the state.

Amongst the Sri Lankan Tamil diaspora, where there are no restrictions on commemorating Mullivaikkal Remembrance Day, large public gatherings are held.

In 2022, Canada declared 18 May as Tamil genocide remembrance day.

See also
 Maaveerar Naal
 Mullivaikal Muttram

References

May observances
Observances honoring victims of war
Sri Lankan Civil War
Sri Lankan Tamil culture
Sri Lankan historical anniversaries
Observances in India